The Steinway Mansion (also the Benjamin Pike Jr. House) is at 18-33 41st Street on a one-acre hilltop in the Astoria neighborhood of Queens in New York City.

History 
The mansion dates to 1858. After Benjamin Pike's death in 1864, his widow sold the mansion to William Steinway of Steinway & Sons in 1870. Jack Halberian purchased the Mansion in 1926 and upon his death in 1976, his son Michael Halberian began an extensive restoration. The New York City Landmarks Preservation Commission designated the building as a landmark in 1966, and it was listed on the National Register of Historic Places in 1983. Henry Z. Steinway, the last member of the Steinway family to be president of the piano company Steinway & Sons, said the "Steinway Mansion" name was misleading, since "the Halberians owned the mansion longer than the Steinways did".

The mansion was placed for sale after Michael Halberian's death in 2010. After years on the market, as well as numerous price reductions, Sal Lucchese and Phil Loria paid $2.6 million for the building in 2014. The mansion was then renovated. At the time, although the Steinway Mansion had been preserved as a landmark, the surrounding neighborhood had been developed with warehouses.

Description
The Steinway Mansion is a large Italianate Villa style dwelling. The architect is unknown. It is constructed of granite and bluestone with cast iron ornamentation and has a two-story, T-shaped central section, with a slate covered gable roof. It has a one-story library, that is now an office, with a wing with large bay windows. It features a four-story tower topped by a balustrade and octagonal cupola. There are three porches supported by cast iron Corinthian order columns. There are five Italian marble fireplaces, pocket doors that hold original cut glass depicting many of Pike's 19th-century scientific instruments. The center main hall contains elaborate carved walnut balustrades, a two-story domed rotunda topped with a central stained glass skylight and  ceilings throughout. There are three large underground cisterns designed to collect rain water from the roof for grounds irrigation and a 1000-gallon copper tank in the attic to furnish the house with a pressurized water system for bath and kitchen use.

In 2006, a documentary film titled The Steinway Mansion was produced and includes extensive interviews with Michael Halberian and Henry Steinway and many rare photos.

See also 
 List of New York City Designated Landmarks in Queens
 National Register of Historic Places listings in Queens
 Modern Art Foundry

References

External links 
 
 
 
 
 

Houses completed in 1858
New York City Designated Landmarks in Queens, New York
Houses on the National Register of Historic Places in Queens, New York
Italianate architecture in New York City
Astoria, Queens